The 1985 World Sportscar Championship season was the 33rd season of FIA World Sportscar Championship motor racing.  It featured the 1985 World Endurance Championship which was contested over a series of races for Group C1 and Group C2 Prototypes, Group B GT Cars and IMSA GTP cars.  The series ran from 14 April 1985 to 1 December 1985 and was composed of 10 races.

This year marked the introduction of Teams titles for outright, Group C2 and GT Cars, replacing the traditional Manufacturers awards. Outright and Group C2 Drivers titles were also awarded.

Schedule

† - Non-points races for teams.

Entries

Group C1

Group C2

Season results

Races

Drivers Championship
Points were awarded to the drivers of the top 10 placed cars in the order of 20-15-12-10-8-6-4-3-2-1 and drivers of C2 cars were also awarded 2 bonus points if they finished in any of the top ten outright positions. However points were not awarded if a driver: 
 drove more than one car in the race
 failed to drive the car for at least 30% of the distance
 drove a car which did not complete 90% of the winner's distance

All drivers were eligible to score points in the overall championship, but drivers of C2 class cars were also awarded points separately for their own title.

Only half points were awarded at Round 9 due to the race being stopped with less than 50% distance having been covered.

World Endurance Championship for Drivers

The 1985 FIA World Endurance Championship for Drivers was awarded jointly to Rothmans Porsche teammates Hans-Joachim Stuck and Derek Bell who shared a Porsche 962C throughout the season

Group C2

The Group C2 title was awarded to Gordon Spice and Ray Bellm who shared a Tiga Ford entered by Spice Engineering.

Teams Championship

Points were awarded to the top 10 finishers in the order of 20-15-12-10-8-6-4-3-2-1, however 
 Teams were only given points for their highest finishing car; any other team cars were merely skipped in the points allocation
 Teams did not score points if the car did not complete 90% of the winner's distance.

All cars were eligible to score for their team in the overall championship, but C2 class cars were also awarded points separately for their own title.

Rounds 2, 8, and 10 were not part of the Teams Championship and counted only for the Drivers titles.

Only half points were awarded at Round 9 due to the race being stopped with less than 50% distance having been covered.

World Endurance Championship for Teams

Group C2 Prototype FIA Cup

FIA Grand Touring Cup

References

External links
 1985 World Endurance Championship for Drivers - Points tables Retrieved from wspr-racing.com on 1 July 2009
 1985 World Endurance Championship for Teams - Points tables Retrieved from wspr-racing.com on 1 July 2009
 1985 World Endurance Championship race results
 1985 World Endurance Championship images Retrieved from www.racingsportscars.com on 1 July 2009

 
World Sportscar Championship seasons
Sports